Qomsheh or Qumisheh or Qowmsheh may refer to various places in Iran:
 Komeshcheh, city in Isfahan Province
 Shahreza, city in Isfahan Province
Qomsheh Tappeh, Kermanshah Province
Qomsheh-ye Baba Karam Khan, Kermanshah Province
Qomsheh-ye Lor Zanganeh, Kermanshah Province
Qomsheh-ye Seyyed Amin, Kermanshah Province
Qomsheh-ye Seyyed Qasem, Kermanshah Province
Qomsheh-ye Seyyed Yaqub, Kermanshah Province